Basketball competitions at the 2011 Pan American Games in Guadalajara were held from October 21 to October 30 at the CODE Dome. Each team was allowed to enter a maximum of twelve athletes. Puerto Rico won both the men's and women's competitions, with Mexico placing second in both competitions. The United States won bronze in the men's competition, while Brazil won bronze in the women's competition.

Medal summary

Medal table

Events

Qualification
An NOC may enter up to one men's team with 12 players and up to one women's team with 12 players. Canada, the United States and the host country qualify automatically, as do five other teams through regional tournaments.

Basketball – Men

Basketball – Women

Schedule
The competition will be spread out across nine days, with the women competing first, followed by the men.

Controversy
The Mexican Olympic Committee (COM) refused to endorse the Mexican Sports Association (ADEMEBA), the body recognized by the International Basketball Federation (FIBA), because FIBA had threatened to suspend ADEMEBA membership which put the entire basketball tournament in jeopardy. However, the Pan American Sports Organization (PASO) later confirmed that the basketball tournament would be held and the event would not be cancelled.

References

 
basketball
2015
2011–12 in South American basketball
2011–12 in North American basketball
International basketball competitions hosted by Mexico